Tiltman might refer to:

 John Tiltman (John Hessell Tiltman) (1894-1982), one of the greatest British cryptanalysts during World War II
 John Hessell Tiltman (property manager) (born 1942), British architect
 A. H. Tiltman (Alfred Hessell Tiltman) (1891-1975), known as Hessell Tiltman, aircraft designer and co-founder of the British aeronautical company Airspeed Ltd
 H. Hessell Tiltman (Hugh Hessell Tiltman) (1897-1976), British writer and journalist 
 Richard Tiltman (born 1960), English footballer

Other
 Hessell-Tiltman Prize 
Murder of Claire Tiltman